William C. Crowley (born 1920 in Dorchester, Massachusetts, died December 1, 1996, in Needham, Massachusetts) was an American sportscaster.

Crowley called New York Yankees games (often paired with Dizzy Dean on the team's telecasts) from 1951 to 1952, and Boston Red Sox games from 1958 to 1960. A World War 2 bomber pilot with the U.S. 8th Air Force division, he served as a sports reporter for the Dayton, Ohio Journal-Herald, switching to Dayton radio station WONE in 1949. A year later he became the play-by-play announcer of the Dayton Indians of the Central League  before leaping to Yankee Stadium in 1951. In between his time with the Yankees and Red Sox, Crowley worked at Holy Cross, where starting in the autumn of 1952 he was a radio announcer for Crusaders football and basketball games, economics professor, and was named Athletics Publicity Director in August, 1953. In 1961, Crowley left the Red Sox' broadcast booth to become the team's public relations director, a position he held until his retirement in 1985. He died on December 1, 1996, from liver cancer.

References

1920 births
1996 deaths
20th-century American journalists
American male journalists
American radio sports announcers
American television sports announcers
Boston Red Sox announcers
College basketball announcers in the United States
College football announcers
Holy Cross Crusaders football announcers
Journalists from Massachusetts
Major League Baseball broadcasters
Minor League Baseball broadcasters
New York Yankees announcers
People from Dorchester, Massachusetts
Sportspeople from Needham, Massachusetts
United States Army Air Forces pilots of World War II